Danny, the Champion of the World is a 1989 British drama film starring Jeremy Irons, with his son, Samuel, in the title role. It is based on the 1975 novel of the same name by Roald Dahl, and tells of a father and son who conspire to thwart a local businessman's plans to buy their land by poaching his game pheasants. It was filmed on location in Oxfordshire, with Stonor Park, Henley-on-Thames, being a prominent feature in the film.

Plot

In 1955 in the English Countryside, impoverished widower William Smith lives with his precocious 9-year-old son Danny in an old vardo behind the garage and filling station they operate together. Wealthy profiteer Victor Hazell, who has bought all of the surrounding land, tries to convince the Smiths to sell as well. William refuses; in response, Hazell sends inspectors to harass William, claiming the Smiths are selling inferior gasoline. When this fails, Hazell suggests to local Child Welfare agents that William may be an unfit parent. However, after noticing how well William keeps the vardo and the shop, and watching Danny fix their rattling old car, the agents agree not to investigate further. One agent tips off William that Hazell sent them.

Meanwhile, Danny starts a new term at school. Delivering a car repair bill to his kindly headmaster, Mr. Snoddy, Danny accidentally discovers Mr. Snoddy is a heavy gin drinker, and agrees to keep the secret. Delivering the bill causes Danny to be late for class; his harsh new teacher, Captain Lancaster, gives him a warning. When Danny is late a second time after helping a rabbit escape a snare, Lancaster gives him 1,000 lines to write.

One night, William sneaks out of the vardo. Discovering this, Danny stays up waiting for him until he returns. William explains that he had been attempting to poach some of Hazell's pheasants as a playful revenge, using raisins as bait; William and his late father poached birds this way before, when they were starving during the Great Depression. Relieved, Danny tells William he can go out poaching again any time he likes, so long as he lets Danny know where he's going. William goes out again some days later, but does not return. Worried, Danny drives an old Austin 7 to Hazell's property, and finds that gamekeepers Rabbets and Springer have caught William in an illegal pit trap. After they leave to fetch Hazell, Danny helps William, who has suffered a broken leg, out of the pit and drives him off to be seen by Doc Spencer. Suspecting the trapped poacher was William, Hazell sends local Police Sergeant Enoch Samways to arrest him; however, Samways, who dislikes Hazell, falsifies the report to say William fell down the vardo stairs. Doc Spencer approves, as William could have been killed by the trap.

When Captain Lancaster mistakenly believes he has caught Danny cheating on a test, he canes Danny's hand. Mr. Snoddy immediately intervenes and threatens to fire Lancaster, as corporal punishment is not allowed in the school. Later, Danny and William learn that Mr. Hazell will be holding a huge pheasant shoot on his property to impress some of the local aristocracy. The Smiths decide to poach all of Hazell's pheasants beforehand, to humiliate him. Danny realizes they can use the sedative Doc Spencer prescribed William; he and William stay up late to crush the pills and stuff the raisins with the powder. Danny falls asleep in class the next day, and Lancaster makes him run laps as punishment after school. Danny escapes the schoolyard, and Lancaster attempts to follow, ripping his trousers. Frustrated, he resigns his position, much to Mr. Snoddy's delight.

The night before the shoot, Danny and William manage to drug and capture hundreds of pheasants, hiding them in the garage. The next morning, after being laughed at by his guests, Hazell sends Rabbets and Springer to find the pheasants. The birds wake earlier than expected and start drunkenly flying around the Smith's garage.
Soon Hazell, his gamekeepers, his guests, and most of the villagers have gathered to see the spectacle. Hazell wants William arrested, but Sergeant Samways reminds Hazell that game birds legally belong to whoever owns the land they are sitting on. Hearing that William still owns his land, Mr. Tallon, a developer, steps forward. It turns out William's refusal to sell has saved the village; without William's centrally-located property, Hazell couldn't go ahead with his secret plan to tear down the village and build a newer and bigger town in its place. Danny lets all the birds go as an act of mercy, and the village celebrates the happy ending together as a furious Hazell drives away.

Main cast

DVD release
A Region 2 DVD was released in 2005 by Warner Bros. It includes a documentary feature called "Danny and the Dirty Dog" (referring to Victor Hazell, who is described as a "dirty dog" by Roald Dahl), which features interviews with Roald Dahl, Jeremy Irons, and Robbie Coltrane (in character as Victor Hazell).

Reception

The film had a mostly positive reviews.

References

External links
 
 
 

1989 films
British television films
British children's films
Disney television films
Films based on children's books
Films based on works by Roald Dahl
Films set in 1955
Films set in England
Films shot in Oxfordshire
Films directed by Gavin Millar
Films scored by Stanley Myers
1980s children's films
1980s English-language films
1980s British films